Robert John Iles (born 2 September 1955) is an English former professional footballer who played in the Football League, as a goalkeeper.

Born in Leicester, Iles joined Chelsea for £10,000 in June 1978 from Southern League Weymouth and made 14 League appearances for the club. His first team opportunities at Chelsea were limited by the form of Peter Bonetti, Petar Borota and Steve Francis. Iles signed for non-league Wealdstone in 1983.

References

Sources
Post War English & Scottish Football League A - Z Player's Transfer Database profile

1955 births
Living people
Footballers from Leicester
English footballers
Association football goalkeepers
AFC Bournemouth players
Poole Town F.C. players
Wealdstone F.C. players
Weymouth F.C. players
Chelsea F.C. players
Yeovil Town F.C. players
Bashley F.C. players
English Football League players